How to Meet the Lucky Stars is a 1996 Hong Kong action comedy film and the final film in the Lucky Stars film series. Featuring the "Lucky Stars" Sammo Hung (in his original role and another role as a cop), Eric Tsang, Richard Ng, Stanley Fung, Michael Miu and new cast member Vincent Lau Tak as Hung's younger cousin and Françoise Yip as their love interest (except for Hung and Lau). Also featuring a number of guest appearances including Natalis Chan, Chen Kuan-tai, Cheng Pei-pei, Chan Hung-lit and Nora Miao. It was produced by Tsang, directed by Frankie Chan with action choreography by Yuen Cheung-yan and Mars. The film was released as a benefit film for the famous Hong Kong film director, Lo Wei, who died in 1996.

Synopsis
During an international gambling competition, "The King of Gamblers" Lui Tin (Chen Kuan-tai) loses to the lascivious, psychotic lesbian queen of gamblers Sheung-kung Fei-fa aka "The Gambling Flower" (Kung Suet-fa) which causes him to commit suicide. His daughter Wai-lam (Fung Sau-yin) vows to avenge her father's death and get help from her late father's good friend. Uncle Wah (Cho Tat-wah), who is a police inspector. Wah also enlists the "Lucky Stars" to assist him.

Cast

The Lucky Stars

The Female Team

Police force

Guest star

Cameo appearance

Box office
This film grossed HK $2,084,545 during its theatrical run from 4–19 July 1996 in Hong Kong.

External links

How to Meet the Lucky Stars at Hong Kong Cinemagic

1996 films
1996 action comedy films
1996 martial arts films
Hong Kong martial arts films
Hong Kong sequel films
1990s Cantonese-language films
Hong Kong action comedy films
Films about gambling
Films set in Hong Kong
Films shot in Hong Kong
Films directed by Frankie Chan
1990s Hong Kong films